Manhush (also Romanized as Manḩūsh; also known as Dowlatābād, Manhūs, and Mankhūsh) is a village in Miyan Ab Rural District, in the Central District of Shushtar County, Khuzestan Province, Iran. At the 2006 census, its population was 357, in 50 families.

References 

Populated places in Shushtar County